Henri Bonnefoy (17 October 1887 – 9 August 1914) was a French sport shooter who competed in the 1908 Summer Olympics.

He was born in Le Tremblois and was killed in action in Thann, Haut-Rhin during World War I.

In 1908 he was a member of the French team which won the bronze medal in the team small-bore rifle competition. He also participated in the stationary target small-bore rifle event and finished 19th.

See also
 List of Olympians killed in World War I

References

External links
profile

1887 births
1914 deaths
Sportspeople from Haute-Saône
French male sport shooters
ISSF rifle shooters
Olympic shooters of France
Shooters at the 1908 Summer Olympics
Olympic bronze medalists for France
French military personnel killed in World War I
Olympic medalists in shooting
Medalists at the 1908 Summer Olympics
20th-century French people